The 2017 FIBA Under-16 Americas Championship was the men's international basketball competition that was held in Formosa, Argentina from 14–18 June 2017.

The  successfully defended their title against , 111–60, in the rematch of the Finals. Meanwhile,  upended the hosts  in the bronze medal game, 78–67, to notch their first ever podium finish in the tournament. 

Due to  named as the hosts of the U17 World Cup next year, another slot was awarded to FIBA Americas, wherein  grabbed the fifth spot by subduing , 71–51. 

The top four teams, excluding Argentina qualified for the 2018 FIBA Under-17 Basketball World Cup as host.

Venue

Qualified teams

Group phase
A draw was held on 23 May 2017 in San Juan, Puerto Rico.

All times are local (UTC−3).

Group A

Group B

Classification round
All times are local (UTC-3).

Classification 5–8

Seventh place game

Fifth place game

Final round
All times are local (UTC-3).

Semifinals

Third place game

Final

Awards

Final ranking

References

External links
2017 FIBA Americas U-16 Championship

FIBA Americas Under-16 Championship
2016–17 in South American basketball
2016–17 in North American basketball
International basketball competitions hosted by Argentina
2016–17 in Argentine basketball
Youth sport in Argentina
June 2017 sports events in South America